Ukrainka is a rural locality (a selo) and the administrative center of Ukrainsky Selsoviet of Seryshevsky District, Amur Oblast, Russia. The population was 1,160 as of 2018. There are 6 streets.

Geography 
Ukrainka is located 14 km northeast of Seryshevo (the district's administrative centre) by road. Belonogovo is the nearest rural locality.

References 

Rural localities in Seryshevsky District